Rising Sun is a 2000 computer wargame developed by TalonSoft and published by Take-Two Interactive. Set during the Pacific War, it is an entry in TalonSoft's Campaign series.

Rising Sun won positive reviews from critics and was nominated for awards by Computer Gaming World and Computer Games Magazine.

Gameplay
Rising Sun is a computer wargame that simulates conflict during the Pacific War.

Development
Rising Sun was developed by TalonSoft as the last game in its Campaign series, following titles such as East Front and West Front. It was released on February 1, 2000.

Reception

Rising Sun received an average score of 82% on the review aggregation website GameRankings. The game was nominated for Computer Games Magazines 2000 "Wargame of the Year" award. Computer Gaming World nominated Rising Sun in the same category, but gave the prize to Combat Mission: Beyond Overlord. The editors called Rising Sun a "terrific" title that "took the traditional hex-based wargame to its zenith".

In Computer Games Magazine, Carl Lund wrote that Rising Suns "epic scope and sheer massiveness ensure replayability for months, if not years, to come." Bruce Geryk of Computer Gaming World similarly praised the game for "tak[ing] the hex-based, sequential-turn wargame to a level of refinement previously unseen".

Legacy

Imperial Strike

Sequel
Although announced as the final game in the Campaign series, Rising Sun received a follow-up in 2001 under the title Divided Ground: Middle East Conflict 1948-1973.

References

External links
Official page (archived)

2000 video games
Computer wargames
Japan in non-Japanese culture
Turn-based strategy video games
Windows games
Windows-only games
World War II video games
Video games developed in the United States
Video games set in the Marshall Islands
Video games set in the Philippines
Pacific War video games
TalonSoft games
Multiplayer and single-player video games
Take-Two Interactive games